Philip Hartley Trenary (August 1, 1954 – September 27, 2018) was an American businessman and civic leader who was the CEO and president of the Greater Memphis Chamber of Commerce and a former CEO of Pinnacle Airlines.

Early life
Philip Hartley Trenary was born on August 1, 1954, in Pawhuska, Oklahoma, the son of May Ruth and Buck Trenary.

He grew up nearby in Shidler, Oklahoma. He learned to fly a plane before he learned to drive a car.

Trenary earned a bachelor's degree in aeronautical engineering technology from Oklahoma State University in 1979.

Career
In 1984, Trenary founded Exec Express Airlines (EEA) in Stillwater, Oklahoma. After EEA was moved to Texas in 1987, it was renamed Lone Star Airlines. In 1997, Trenary moved to Memphis to run a local airline that would become Pinnacle Airlines, a $1 billion turnover, regional airline employing 7,700 people.

Personal life and death
Trenary was married to Bridget, they had three children, and later divorced.

Trenary was shot dead in Memphis on September 27, 2018. He was 64.

References

1954 births
2018 deaths
People from Pawhuska, Oklahoma
American company founders
American chief executives
Deaths by firearm in Tennessee
People murdered in Tennessee
Oklahoma State University alumni
People from Memphis, Tennessee
Businesspeople from Oklahoma
Businesspeople from Tennessee
20th-century American businesspeople